Salman Isa Ghuloom (born 12 July 1977), known to many as just Salman Isa, is a retired Bahraini footballer who played as a winger or a wingback.

World Cup Qualifiers

Salman is noted for scoring for Bahrain in the Asia-Concacaf playoff qualifier for the 2006 FIFA World Cup in Germany against Trinidad and Tobago. In doing so he gave Bahrain the lead, playing away at Port of Spain in the first leg. That gave Bahrain the advantage to qualify for the World Cup, but Trinidad's Chris Birchall equalized to end the match. In the second Leg in Bahrain, Dennis Lawrence scored to give Trinidad and Tobago the win and help them qualify for the 2006 FIFA World Cup, for the first time in their history.

Club career

Ghuloom has played for a number of clubs during his footballing career. At 28 he is a very experienced footballer. Ghuloom started his career at small first division (the 2nd tier of Bahraini football) club Isa Town or Madinat Isa. This club produced former Bahrain national team captain, and Ghuloom's teammate, Talal Yousif. Ghuloom's excellent performance for the club prompted one of the three big Bahraini clubs, Al Riffa, to sign him along with Isa Town teammate Talal Yousef. After signing for Al Riffa he made a huge impact helping them to the Bahraini Premiership title in 2002–2003. During his time at Al Riffa he played under Bahraini Manager Riyadh Al Thawadi who would go on to manage the Bahrain national team for one match against Kuwait. Salman Isa plays his trade for Al-Arabi of Qatar currently and is one of the most consistent players at the club.

Glory Days

Ghuloom is known for his hardworking and tireless displays on the wing, but as Talal Yousif who was deployed as a more offensive player for Al Riffa left for Kuwait SC, Riyadh Al Thawadi decided to push Ghuloom upfield and play him as a forward. This decision proved to be vital as Ghuloom scored 15 goals as a striker, leaving him as the league's top scorer. Ghuloom's amazing form also helped Al Riffa to the 2004–2005 league championship and the Crown Prince Cup. In which Ghuloom scored in the final. Ghuloom's best for the national team came in the 2004 Gulf Arabian Cup in Qatar. Ghuloom scored an amazing goal in the historic 3–0 win over Bahrain's fierce rivals and neighbors, the more famous Saudi Arabia. Ghuloom's hardworking ethics paid off as Bahrain again qualified for the semi finals although they were knocked out by Oman. Nevertheless, Bahrain still finished in third place. After the 2004–2005 season Ghuloom's amazing displays prompted Al Arabi of Qatar, where fellow national team player and captain Mohamed Salmeen plays, to sign Ghuloom from then Bahraini champions Al Riffa. At Al Riffa Ghuloom was a cult hero and fans referred to him as "AL JANAH AL TAER" which means the flying wing, for his speedy runs through the wings. At Al Arabi, Ghuloom continued to display good form although there he was being used mostly as a defender or wing back. Currently Salman Isa is defending the colors of Al-Arabi and is the captain of the club.

International career

Asian Cup 2004

In 2004 Bahrain qualified for the 2004 AFC Asian Cup in China. Although Salman missed the many games of the tournament due to injury, he still managed to play a few matches in Bahrain's run to the Semi Finals. After the Asian Cup, most of the members of the national team were signed by big Qatari clubs such as Al Gharafa, Al Arabi, and Al Rayyan. Team players such as Mohamed Ahmed Salmeen and Alaa Hubail moved on to Qatar. While others like Talal Yousif for instance decided to move to Kuwait. After this The Bahraini Premiership appeared to have lost some of its most important players. Although the loss of many national team members meant the rise of Salman.

See also 
 List of men's footballers with 100 or more international caps

References

External links

Salman Isa Ghuloom - Century of International Appearances - RSSSF.com

1977 births
Living people
Bahraini footballers
Expatriate footballers in Qatar
Bahrain international footballers
Bahraini expatriates in Qatar
Al-Arabi SC (Qatar) players
riffa SC players
manama Club players
2004 AFC Asian Cup players
2011 AFC Asian Cup players
FIFA Century Club
Footballers at the 2002 Asian Games
Association football fullbacks
Qatar Stars League players
Bahraini Premier League players
Asian Games competitors for Bahrain
Bahraini people of Pakistani descent